Football South Coast is a sport governing body and soccer competition based in the Illawarra and South Coast regions of New South Wales. All competitions and soccer activity of Football South Coast is under control of Football New South Wales.

Teams and structure

Premier League
Twelve clubs compete in the Premier league in 1st Grade, 2nd Grade and Youth League.
 Albion Park White Eagles
 Bellambi Rosellas
 Bulli FC
 Coniston 
 Corrimal Rangers
 Cringila Lions
 Port Kembla
 South Coast Croatia
 Tarrawanna Blueys
 Wollongong Olympic
 Wollongong United
 Woonona Sharks

District League 
Twelve (12) clubs compete in the district league across three competitions (First, Second and Youth)
 Balgownie Rangers
 Berkeley Sports 
 Fernhill Foxes
 Helensburgh Thistles 
 Kiama Quarriers 
 Oak Flats Falcons 
 Picton Rangers 
 Thirroul Thunder 
 Unanderra Hearts
 University 
 Warilla Wanderers

Community Leagues
 The community leagues comprise all ages divisions and Over 35's Masters Leagues and Over 45's

Women Leagues 
 The Women's leagues comprise all age divisions, youth league and Over 30's competition.

Junior Leagues 
 Competition leagues for players 12 up to 18 allocated into age / divisions and Girls divisions
 Mini Roo format for players 5 to 11.

History
Football South Coast (FSC) was established in 2008 as a unification of all soccer associations and governing bodies in the area. This was the result of Football NSW desire to organise and manage all regions within its borders effectively. The merger involved five key associations: Illawarra Football Association (IFA), Illawarra Junior Football Association (IJFA), Illawarra Amateur Football Association (IAFA), Illawarra Women's Football Association (IWFA), and the Referee's Association. These bodies have been dissolved to make way for FSC. The Wollongong Wolves and Illawarra Stingrays are separate clubs which participate in State League competitions run by Football NSW.

Councils
There are five main councils of Football South Coast. They are the Men's, Women's, Junior's, Community League and Referee's.

See also

AFL South Coast
South Coast Open

References

External links
 Football South Coast Official Site

Soccer leagues in New South Wales
South
2008 establishments in Australia
Sports leagues established in 2008
South Coast (New South Wales)